Barsha Singh Bariha is an Indian politician from the Biju Janata Dal representing the Padampur constituency in the Odisha Legislative Assembly.

Biography 
She won the 5 December 2022 by-election with 120,807 votes and a margin of 42,679 votes, following the death of her father, Bijaya Ranjan Singh Bariha, who previously held the seat. She is the daughter-in-law of Ramaranjan Baliarsingh, a former member of Odisha Legislative Assembly from Satyabadi constituency.

References 

Living people
Year of birth missing (living people)
Odisha MLAs 2019–2024
Odisha politicians
21st-century Indian women politicians